Lucas ("Luuk") Petrus van Troost (born 28 December 1969) is a former Dutch cricketer, who captained the national team. He usually batted between no. 6 and no. 8 in the order, and when in form scored quickly with his hard hitting, while his bowling was relatively rarely called upon but provides a handy option where required.

His brother Andre also played for the Netherlands, as well as for Somerset.

External links
 

1969 births
Living people
Dutch cricket captains
Netherlands One Day International cricketers
Cricketers at the 2003 Cricket World Cup
Cricketers at the 2007 Cricket World Cup
Sportspeople from Schiedam
Dutch cricketers